Jean Dréjac, stage name of Jean André Jacques Brun (3 June 1921, in Grenoble – 11 August 2003, in Paris) was a French singer and composer.

He is noted for writing the songs "Ah! Le petit vin blanc", "Sous le ciel de Paris" and "La Chansonnette" (for Yves Montand), the French adaptations of "Black Denim Trousers and Motorcycle Boots" for Édith Piaf and "Bleu, blanc, blond" for Marcel Amont, and various songs for Serge Reggiani (with Michel Legrand as composer).

He was an adjoint secretary of the Société des auteurs, compositeurs et éditeurs de musique from 1967 to 1969, and a vice-president from 1977 to 2002.

He is the father of writer Frédéric Brun, born in 1960 in Paris.

Honors 
 2003: Commandeur de l'Ordre des Arts et Lettres.

Bibliography 
 .
 .

References

External links 
 

Commandeurs of the Ordre des Arts et des Lettres
Musicians from Grenoble
1921 births
2003 deaths
20th-century French  male singers